Alexander Hoehn-Saric is an American attorney and government official. Since October 2021, Hoehn-Saric has served as chair of the Consumer Product Safety Commission, concurrently serving as a commissioner. Hoehn-Saric is a Democrat.

Early life and education
Hoehn-Saric was born to immigrants from China and Austria and grew up in Baltimore, Maryland. He received a bachelor's degree in political science from the University of Chicago and a JD from UCLA Law School.

Career
Hoehn-Saric previously served as Chief Counsel for Communications and Consumer Protection for the House Committee on Energy and Commerce. He worked on legislation and oversight on issues ranging from product safety to communications.

On the Senate side, he served as senior counsel for the U.S. Senate Committee on Commerce, Science and Transportation, handling product safety and consumer protection matters. Hoehn-Saric also served at the United States Department of Commerce as the Deputy General Counsel for Strategic Initiatives.

Consumer Product Safety Commission (CPSC) 
On July 2, 2021, President Joe Biden nominated Hoehn-Saric to be both a member and the chair of the Consumer Product Safety Commission. Hearings were held before the Senate Commerce Committee on July 28, 2021. The committee favorably reported his nomination to the Senate floor on September 22, 2021. Hoehn-Saric was confirmed by the entire Senate via voice vote on October 7, 2021.

Hoehn-Saric started his position in October 2021. In office, Hoehn-Saric has cautioned consumers from believing that products on shelves are necessarily safe and have met government approval before sale.

Personal life
Hoehn-Saric has a wife named Loren. They currently reside in Maryland with their son and daughter.

References

American lawyers
U.S. Consumer Product Safety Commission personnel
University of Chicago alumni
UCLA School of Law alumni
Living people
People from Baltimore
American people of Chinese descent
American people of Austrian descent
Year of birth missing (living people)